Eyn ol Zaman (also Romanized as ‘Eyn ol Zamān; also known as ‘Eyn oz Zamān and Eyn Zamān) is a village in Gheyzaniyeh Rural District, in the Central District of Ahvaz County, Khuzestan Province, Iran. At the 2006 census, its population was 142, in 24 families.

References 

Populated places in Ahvaz County